Ha-Yeladim Mi'Givat Napoleon (The kids of Napoleon hill) was an Israeli television drama created by , Gur Bentwich and Shlomo Mashiah. The series was broadcast on Arutz HaYeladim between 2001–2004. In 2004, it won the Israeli Television Academy Award for Best Children's Series.

The series is about children who spend their summer discovering mysteries.

Cast 
 Yon Tumarkin as Ido Klein
 Dror Ziv as Tomer
 Raz Plato as Yuval Levin
 Alex Lin as Gil
 Ana Sgan-Cohen as Ella
 Dana Bublil as Dana
 Haran Sagi as Avi Klein
 Gilya Stern as Dafna Klein
 Mati Seri as Michael Levin
 Tzahi Grad as Superintendent Sussmann
 Limor Prag as Tzameret Karni

External links
 

Israeli children's television series
2001 Israeli television series debuts
2004 Israeli television series endings
Israeli teen drama television series